Hussain Jamaan Alhamdah is a Saudi Arabian long-distance runner. At the 2012 Summer Olympics, he competed in the Men's 5000 metres, finishing 38th overall in Round 1, failing to qualify for the final.

Doping ban 
Alhamdah was handed a 30-month doping ban in 2013, after irregularities were found in his biological passport profile. His results from 2009 onwards were also annulled.

References

1983 births
Living people
Saudi Arabian male long-distance runners
Olympic athletes of Saudi Arabia
Athletes (track and field) at the 2012 Summer Olympics
Doping cases in athletics
Saudi Arabian sportspeople in doping cases